Niamh Louise Charles (born 21 June 1999) is an English professional footballer who plays as a right-back for Women's Super League club Chelsea and the England women's national team.

Early career
Charles grew up on the Wirral in Merseyside and spent her youth career at the West Kirby Wasps. Excelling when playing with boys up to the age of 14, where she was regularly the only female player on the pitch, after a successful trial, she became a member of Liverpool's youth setup, which she chose over rivals Everton.

Club career

Liverpool
After impressing in the academy, Charles made her senior debut in April 2016 in a draw against Sunderland. Following her excellent 2016 season with Liverpool and the England U-17s, she was nominated for the Women's Rising Star award at the Northwest Football Awards.

Chelsea
Following Liverpool's relegation at the end of the 2019–20 season, Charles signed for Chelsea and won the double in her first season. She also started in the Champions League final, where Chelsea lost to Barcelona.

Charles won the double with Chelsea again the season after and since then has fully established herself as a regular starter.

International career
In her youth career, Charles represented England at under-17, under-19 and under-20 levels.

During UEFA U-17 qualifying, Charles was the third-leading scorer for England with six goals. She then tied for the Bronze Boot at the final tournament with four goals, helping England finish third and qualify for the 2016 FIFA U-17 Women's World Cup, where she played in all four matches without scoring as England were eliminated by Japan in the quarter-finals.

Charles made her debut for the senior side on April 9th 2021 as a half-time substitute for Alex Greenwood in a friendly against France.

On 27 May 2021, it was announced that Charles had been selected as one of four reserve players for the Great Britain women's Olympic football team at the 2020 Tokyo Olympics. A year later, she was named in the pre-tournament squad for UEFA Women's Euro 2022 on home soil, but became one of three unfortunate players who narrowly missed the cut for the final 23. England went on to win the whole tournament.

Charles was allotted 220 when the FA announced their legacy numbers scheme to honour the 50th anniversary of England’s inaugural international.

Career statistics

Club
.

International
Statistics accurate as of match played 11 November 2022.

Honours
Chelsea
Women's Super League: 2020–21, 2021–22
Women's FA Cup: 2020–21, 2021–22
UEFA Women's Champions League runner-up: 2020–21

England
Arnold Clark Cup: 2022, 2023

References

External links

1999 births
Living people
English women's footballers
Liverpool F.C. Women players
Women's Super League players
Women's association football defenders
England women's youth international footballers
England women's international footballers
Olympic footballers of Great Britain
Footballers at the 2020 Summer Olympics
Chelsea F.C. Women players